Thoiry is a commune in the Yvelines department in the Île-de-France region in north-central France. It is the location of Château de Thoiry.

In popular culture
The town was mentioned in the song by "Thoiry" by Italian rappers Quentin40 and Puritano.

See also
Communes of the Yvelines department

References

Communes of Yvelines